Josef Mengele was a Nazi war criminal.

Mengele may also refer to:
Meņģele parish, in Ogre municipality, Latvia

People with the surname
Benno Mengele, (1890–1971), Austrian electrical engineer

See also
Mengler, German surname